Peter Wadams, better known by his stage name P-Money, is a New Zealand hip-hop DJ and producer. One of his best-known works is "Everything", featuring New Zealand R&B singer Vince Harder, which reached number one on the New Zealand Singles Chart for three weeks in 2008; however, he is probably best known for his recordings with Scribe, including the 2003 smash hit "Not Many".
Peter Wadams is also credited as co-writer and producer on the 2017 hit "Call on Me" by Australian singer Starley.

Career
P-Money's initial entry into the music industry was via DJ competitions and student radio.
In 2004, he released his second studio album, Magic City, which charted at #2 on the RIANZ New Zealand Singles Chart. His first single of the album, "Stop the Music", featuring New Zealand rapper Scribe, scored P-Money his first solo #1 single and also charted within the top 10 of the Australian ARIAnet singles chart in April 2005. The album included collaborations with local and international artists such as Akon, Skillz, Jatis, Aasim, Capone, Sauce Money, Bobby Creekwater, Grandmaster Roc Raida and Scribe. The second single off the album "Keep on Calling", featured rising American hip-hop star Akon and charted at #23 in New Zealand.

He won the awards "Best Producer" (for his work on Scribe's multi-platinum album The Crusader) and "Songwriter of the Year" at the 2004 New Zealand Music Awards.

P-Money records for the label Dirty Records, which he co-owns with Callum August. The label was formed in 2002.

In September 2008, he released "Everything", featuring Vince Harder, which peaked at number one on the RIANZ New Zealand Singles Chart on 13 October, scoring P-Money his second number one in his native country. In February 2009, a follow-up to "Everything", "Angels", was released to radio and digital music services.

In 2015, P-Money produced the soundtrack to the New Zealand film Born to Dance.

Awards
 1999 New Zealand ITF DJ Battle National Champion
 2000 New Zealand ITF DJ Battle National Champion
 2000 bNet New Zealand Music Awards – Best Turntablist
 2001 bNet New Zealand Music Awards – Best Turntablist
 2001 New Zealand ITF DJ Battle National Champion
 2001 Technics DMC New Zealand Champion
 2001 3rd Place Technics DMC WORLD DJ CHAMPIONSHIPS
 2002 bNet New Zealand Music Awards – Best Hip-Hop Release – "Big Things"
 2004 APRA Silver Scroll Award – Songwriter of the Year – "Not Many"
 2004 RIANZ New Zealand Music Awards – Best Producer – Scribe "The Crusader"
 2004 RIANZ New Zealand Music Awards – Songwriter/s of the Year – "Not Many"
 2005 bNet New Zealand Music Awards – Best Hip-Hop Release – "Magic City"
 2005 RIANZ New Zealand Music Awards – Best Urban Album – "Magic City"
 2005 RIANZ New Zealand Music Awards – Best Male Solo Artist
 2006 Australian Urban Music Awards – Best DJ
 2006 Australian Urban Music Awards – Best Hip-Hop Single – "Stop the Music"
 2007 Australian Urban Music Awards – Best Producer
 2009 – RIANZ New Zealand Music Awards – Single of the Year Finalist – "Everything ft. Vince Harder"
 2010 – RIANZ New Zealand Music Awards – Best Electronic Album Finalist – "Everything [Album]"

Discography

Albums

Singles

Notes

References

External links
AudioCulture profile
P-Money's official home page – Information, photos, and video clips

New Zealand hip hop DJs
Living people
1978 births